Koei Chai is a tambon (sub-district) of Chum Saeng District, Nakhon Sawan Province, upper central Thailand.

History
Koei Chai dates back to Ayutthaya period, at that time it was called "Koei Sai" (เกยทราย, literally: beached sand), which at the confluence of the Nan and Yom Rivers was the place where the hydraulic lime tanker falls in the reign of King  Suriyenthrathibodi (Sanphet VIII), also known as Tiger King. At present, it is the location of Wat Koei Chai Neua, an ancient temple with a pagoda that contained the relics of Lord Buddha.

In the Thonburi period, King Taksin stopped his army here and was shot in the shin before retreating to the Thonburi Kingdom. Therefore is the source of his monument along the Nan River in downtown Chum Saeng today.

According to a short note, only two lines of Prince Damrong stated that its skull was very large and was preserved here, but at that time it had already been sold to a foreigner in Bangkok.

Geography
Neighbouring tambons are (from the north clockwise): Chum Saeng, Phikun, Nong Krachao, Phikun, Khok Mo, Phan Lan, Phai Sing, Tha Mai, Phai Sing.

Koei Chai is also a place full of over 20,000 toddy palm trees, some of which are older than 300 years old.

Administration

Central administration
Koei Chai subdivided into 16 administrative mubans (villages)

Local administration
Koei Chai is administered by the Subdistrict Administrative Organization (SAO) Koei Chai (องค์การบริหารส่วนตำบลเกยไชย), established in 1996.

Places
Wat Koei Chai Neua
Wat Koei Chai Tai
Chum Saeng Hospital

Local products
Because it is a place that has a lot of toddy palm trees, the villagers therefore have a career in palm and processing products from these fruits

Palm fruit sap
Nam phrik (Thai chili paste)

References

Tambon of Nakhon Sawan Province